Great Malvern railway station is one of two stations serving the town of Malvern, Worcestershire, England (the other being Malvern Link station) on the Hereford to Worcester section of the Cotswold Line. It is situated downhill from the centre of Great Malvern and close to Barnards Green. The station retains most of its original Victorian station design by the architect Edmund Wallace Elmslie and is a Grade II listed building.

History
Great Malvern station was opened by the Worcester and Hereford Railway in 1860 and the present buildings, by architect Edmund Wallace Elmslie, were completed in 1862. The Midland Railway and the London and North Western Railway collaborated on the construction cost; the solicitor, Samuel Carter, was also solicitor to both of these major companies. It was later absorbed by the Great Western Railway.

Lady Emily Foley was a key sponsor of the building of Great Malvern station. She had a waiting room made for her exclusive use at Great Malvern Station, which is now ‘Lady Foley's Tea Room’.

The station celebrated its 150th birthday on 23 May 2010 with the unveiling of a plaque and a special train. An additional part of this celebration was the reinstatement of some of the highly decorated lighting columns around the cab road at the front of the station.

Architecture
The buildings are in local Malvern Rag stone and follow a French Gothic theme.

Floral capitals to canopy columns

A particular feature of the station are the deep canopies which are supported by elaborate, cast-iron girders, which are in turn supported by columns with elaborate capitals. These capitals are decorated with high relief mouldings depicting different arrangements of flowers and foliage. The sculptor William Forsyth was employed to work on the buildings and designed the metal capitals of the columns which support the canopies above both platforms of the station.

The Worm access to Imperial Hotel

At the end of Platform 2 is the entrance to the Worm, an enclosed passageway which leads under Avenue Road into the former Imperial Hotel (now Malvern St James). It formed a private pedestrian access and is believed to be the only structure of its kind in the country. Although in need of extensive restoration and generally not open to the public, the Worm is itself Grade II listed.

Services
The station is served by two train operating companies: West Midlands Trains (who manage the station) and Great Western Railway. West Midlands Trains operate services to Birmingham New Street via Worcester and  every hour and also some services to Whitlocks End and Dorridge via the Snow Hill Lines. A handful of West Midlands Trains services start or terminate here each day, to/from Worcester & Birmingham.

Great Western Railway operate a roughly hourly service to London Paddington via the Cotswold Line and Oxford (some of which run to/from Hereford) and every two hours (except Sundays) to  via . Many Bristol services continue onwards to  & . Terminating services (including all from Bristol) generally run empty to Malvern Wells to reverse, then return to the station to take up their next scheduled working.

There was previously a branch line to Ashchurch via  and Tewkesbury.  Operated by the Midland Railway, it was closed in 1952.

This service has since been withdrawn.

Facilities
There is a ticket office and an award-winning café which opened in 1984,  named 'Lady Foley's Tea Room', after Lady Emily Foley, on the London-bound platform.

Refurbishment
In 2022 Network Rail is spending £8 million on restoration of the platform canopies, sculptures, overhead glazing and  ironwork. The  work, which will not cause any disruption to services, is expected to be finished by early 2023. The Victorian station clock is now also working following an £8,000 restoration in 2021 after having been stuck for over three years. The work included replacing all the glass in the station canopies.

References

Further reading

External links

Malvern, Worcestershire
Grade II listed railway stations
Railway stations in Worcestershire
DfT Category D stations
Former Great Western Railway stations
Railway stations in Great Britain opened in 1860
Railway stations served by Great Western Railway
Railway stations served by West Midlands Trains
1860 establishments in England